Cynthia Boyd Stone (February 26, 1926 – December 25, 1988) was an American actress.

Life and career
Born in Peoria, Illinois, Stone was the daughter of banker John Boyd Stone and Dorothy Drayton. She was a graduate of Foxcroft School in Middleburg, Virginia.

Stone had a brief career in the 1950s and 1960s as a television actress. Though she mainly appeared in guest spots in various television series, she and then-husband Jack Lemmon appeared together in the short-lived series, Heaven for Betsy (1952). They had previously featured in another short-lived series, That Wonderful Guy (1949).

Stone also appeared in Colgate commercials.

Personal life and death
On May 7, 1950, she married actor Jack Lemmon. The couple had a son, Christopher Boyd Lemmon, in 1954, an actor and an author, but divorced in 1956. She married Cliff Robertson in 1957. They had a daughter, Stephanie, in 1959, and also divorced in 1959. In 1960, Stone married Robert MacDougal III. Stone's marriage to MacDougal lasted until she died.

Stone founded a volunteer anti-drug program, Concern Unlimited, and she was past president and founder of the Coconut Grove Republican Women's Club.

Stone died on December 25, 1988, aged 62. She was buried in a family plot in Springdale Cemetery in Peoria.

Filmography

Television
 That Wonderful Guy (Unknown episodes, 1949)
 The Ad-Libbers (5 episodes, 1951)
 The Frances Langford-Don Ameche Show (unknown episodes, 1951–52)
 Heaven for Betsy (Unknown episodes, 1952)
 Short Short Dramas (1 episode, 1953)
 Medic (1 episode, 1956)
 Cavalcade of America (1 episode, 1956)
 Celebrity Playhouse (1 episode, 1956)
 Soldiers of Fortune (1 episode, 1957)
 Dr. Kildare (unknown episodes)
 Felony Squad (1 episode, 1966)

References

External links
 

1926 births
1988 deaths
20th-century American actresses
Actors from Peoria, Illinois
Actresses from Illinois
American television actresses
Lemmon family